Janouk Kelderman (born 7 May 1991 in Doetinchem) is a Dutch actor, singer and television presenter.

Career

Television 
While looking for an internship in 2013, Kelderman started working as Keet!, a presenter on RTL Telekids. She left the role in 2017, citing a desire to focus on other projects.

She started working as a presenter on NTR's Het klokhuis in 2017.

Following the cancellation of the Eurovision Song Contest 2020 due to the COVID-19 pandemic, Kelderman was selected as the host of Eurovision Song Celebration 2020 on the contest's YouTube channel, as a replacement for the semi-finals featuring all 41 songs in a non-competitive format.

Film 

Filmography

Television

as Keet! (2013–2017)

as Janouk Kelderman (2017–present)

Film

Discography

as Keet! (2013–2017)

References

External links 

 Official website
 

1991 births
Living people
Dutch film actresses
Dutch stage actresses
Dutch television actresses
People from Doetinchem
Dutch musical theatre actresses
Dutch women singers
21st-century Dutch actresses